This is a list of wars involving the State of Libya and its predecessor states.

See also
 Libyan resistance movement

References

External links
 "Qaddafi Plays Quietly, But He's Still in the Game," The New York Times, March 17, 1991.

 
Libya
Military history of Libya
Wars